Cerro Pasto Salado is a mountain in the Chilean area of the Andes. It has a height of 4843 metres.

See also
List of mountains in the Andes

References

Pasto Salado